North Belleville may refer to:

North Belleville, Indiana
North Belleville, Nova Scotia